Adrianus Johannes "Ad" Tak (born 8 June 1953) is a retired Dutch cyclist who was active between 1973 and 1985. He competed at the 1976 Summer Olympics and finished in 50th place in the road race.

His uncle, Anton Tak, was also a professional cyclist.

See also
 List of Dutch Olympic cyclists

References

1953 births
Living people
Dutch male cyclists
Olympic cyclists of the Netherlands
Cyclists at the 1976 Summer Olympics
People from Halderberge
Cyclists from North Brabant